Hassan Amin may refer to:

 Sayed Hassan Amin (born 1948), Iranian lawyer, scholar and author
 Hassan Amin (footballer) (born 1991), Afghan-German footballer